Tajon Trevor Buchanan (born February 8, 1999) is a Canadian professional soccer player who plays as a winger for Belgian Pro League side Club Brugge and the Canada national team.

Club career

Early career
Buchanan was born and raised in Brampton, Ontario and is of Jamaican descent. His father died when Buchanan was seven years old. He began playing soccer with Brampton Youth SC, when he was eight. Buchanan won the 2014 IMG Cup with the Mississauga Falcons. At age 15, he moved with his best friend and his best friend's father (and his former coach), Chrys Chrysanthou, to Colorado where he joined the USSDA academy Real Colorado.

Buchanan spent two years playing college soccer at Syracuse University between 2017 and 2018, making 33 appearances, scoring 12 goals, and tallying six assists. After two years with the Orange, Buchanan left early and signed a Generation Adidas contract with Major League Soccer ahead of the 2019 MLS SuperDraft.

In summer 2018, Buchanan played for League1 Ontario side Sigma FC, making seven appearances and scoring two goals.

New England Revolution
On January 11, 2019, Buchanan was selected 9th overall in the 2019 MLS SuperDraft by New England Revolution. He made his professional debut on March 9, 2019, as an 81st-minute substitute during a 2–0 loss to Columbus Crew SC. On November 24, 2020, he scored his first MLS Cup playoffs goal, scoring the second and final goal in a 2–0 win over the Philadelphia Union.

During the 2021 season Buchanan's continued good form for the Revolution earned him a nomination to the MLS squad for the 2021 MLS All-Star Game in August 2021.

Club Brugge
In August 2021, Buchanan signed a 3 and a half year deal with Belgian First Division A champions Club Brugge. Buchanan was loaned back to New England Revolution for the remainder of the 2021 MLS season. He made his debut for Brugge against Sint-Truiden on January 15, 2022. Buchanan scored his first goal for Brugge on April 24 against Antwerp.

He is known in Belgium for his aggressive playing style. In 2023 there was an incident when he threw his elbow in the face of Gift Orban.

International career

Youth
Buchanan was named to the Canadian U-23 provisional roster for the 2020 CONCACAF Men's Olympic Qualifying Championship on February 26, 2020.  A year later, he was named to the final squad for the rescheduled tournament on March 10, 2021. In Canada's opening match, Buchanan scored a brace in a 2–0 victory over El Salvador. He was named the 2020 Canada Soccer Youth International Player of the Year.

Senior
He accepted an invite for the Canadian senior national team camp for January 2021. Buchanan was called up in June 2021 for the coming World Cup qualification matches against Aruba and Suriname, and subsequently made his senior-team debut against Aruba, setting up two goals in a 7–0 victory. On June 18 Buchanan was named to Canada's 60-man preliminary squad for the 2021 CONCACAF Gold Cup. On July 1 he was called up to the final 23-man squad. He scored his first goal for the senior team on July 29 against Mexico in the semi-final stage of the Gold Cup, netting the equalizer in an eventual 2–1 defeat. Buchanan's play at the tournament was widely praised by the region's media and at the conclusion of the competition he was named as the recipient of the 2021 CONCACAF Gold Cup Best Young Player Award.

In November 2022, Buchanan was named to Canada's squad for the 2022 FIFA World Cup.

Career statistics

Club

International

Scores and results list Canada's goal tally first, score column indicates score after each Buchanan goal.

Honours
New England Revolution
 Supporters' Shield: 2021

Club Brugge
 Belgian First Division A: 2021–22
Individual
 CONCACAF Gold Cup Best XI: 2021
 CONCACAF Gold Cup Young Player Award: 2021
MLS Best XI: 2021
Canadian Youth International Player of the Year: 2020

References

External links

1999 births
Living people
Black Canadian soccer players
Canadian soccer players
Association football forwards
Syracuse Orange men's soccer players
New England Revolution draft picks
New England Revolution players
League1 Ontario players
Major League Soccer players
Canada men's under-23 international soccer players
Canada men's international soccer players
Canadian sportspeople of Jamaican descent
2021 CONCACAF Gold Cup players
2022 FIFA World Cup players
Sigma FC players
Club Brugge KV players
Belgian Pro League players
Soccer players from Brampton
Canadian expatriate soccer players
Canadian expatriate sportspeople in the United States
Expatriate soccer players in the United States
Canadian expatriate sportspeople in Belgium
Expatriate footballers in Belgium